Dynea Halt was a railway station in Rhydyfelin near Pontypridd, Wales. It was a small halt on the Pontypridd, Caerphilly and Newport Railway, and closed in 1956.

History and description
Like the other halts on the line, Dynea opened in 1904 to cater for the local railmotor passenger services. In October 1908, the halt was badly damaged in a flood. An avalanche of water and rubble swept through the area before over-spilling into the Glamorganshire Canal. In 1924, the suffix 'halt' was added by the GWR.

Dynea had ground-level platforms with partially-open wooden shelters inside wooden enclosures. The gates of these would be unlocked when a train arrived. The shelters do not appear in later photographs, probably removed at some date before the 1950s. In 1931, the GWR added a down siding some 300 yards from Dynea Halt, controlled by the Dynea signal box. At some later date, a ground frame was added to control it, but this development was short-lived, and the siding was gone by 1943.

Dynea closed in 1956, along with all the remaining halts on the line.

After closure
There are no traces remaining of the halt. The site is now part of the Nantgarw-Treforest cycle track.

References

External links
Railtour 1952

Railway stations in Great Britain opened in 1904
Railway stations in Great Britain closed in 1956
Former Great Western Railway stations
Disused railway stations in Rhondda Cynon Taf